Arthur Berckmans (3 May 1929 – 28 December 2020), better known as Berck, was a Belgian comics author, best known for Sammy.

Biography
Arthur Berckmans was born in Leuven in 1929. He studied drawing at the Art academy of Leuven and at the Institut Saint-Luc in Brussels. His first job as an illustrator was in 1948 for the Flemish Jesuit magazine Pro Apostolis. He also illustrated some youth novels, and started to work at PubliArt, a publicity division of Le Lombard, where he made many drawings and a few publicity comics, appearing in many Belgian newspapers and magazines.

In 1958, Berck was asked by Tintin magazine to collaborate with René Goscinny on a new comical series, Strapontin. The series became a moderate success, and Berck created a few other series for the magazine, the most notable being Rataplan.

In the meantime, he also started working for Zonneland, the youth magazine of Altiora Averbode, the publishing house of the abbey of Averbode. In later years, he contributed to Sjors, one of the major Dutch comics magazines, where he created the series Lowietje.

But his main breakthrough came when he worked for Spirou magazine. His first series, Mulligan, did not make much of an impact, but when he teamed up with Raoul Cauvin for Sammy, a series about an unlikely pair of bodyguards in Chicago at the time of Al Capone and Eliot Ness, he quickly became one of the more popular artists of the magazine, and the albums got impressive sales. Berck ceased his work on all other series to focus solely on Sammy.

In 1994, Berck announced that he would retire. While this is usual in Belgium at the age of 65, it was an almost unprecedented move for a comics artist. Sammy was continued by the experienced artist Jean-Pol.

Bibliography

This bibliography only lists the comics Berck made which were published as an album in French or Dutch. He further made many short stories, illustrations, and comics for magazines only (e.g. 59 short comics featuring Mischa). His work has been translated into Danish, Finnish, German and Spanish.

Awards
 1973: Prix Saint-Michel for Best Comical Artwork, Brussels, Belgium
 1975: Prix Saint-Michel for Best Comical Comic
 1985: Bronzen Adhemar, Turnhout, Belgium

Notes

Sources
 Béra, Michel; Denni, Michel; and Mellot, Philippe: "Trésors de la Bande Dessinée 1999-2000". Les éditions de l'amateur, Paris, 1998. 
 Matla, Hans: "Stripkatalogus 9: De negende dimensie". Panda, Den Haag, 1998.

External links

 
 

Writers from Leuven
1929 births
2020 deaths
Belgian comics artists
Belgian comics writers